Jacobine (Bizzie) Severine Henriette Høyer (26 March 1888 – 10 May 1971) was a Danish painter and art teacher.

Biography
Born in the Frederiksberg district of Copenhagen, Høyer attended the Royal Danish Academy of Fine Arts from 1904 to 1909. She later studied at the Academy's school of decoration under Einar Utzon-Frank (1922–24). Her painting style was at times almost Impressionistic but she could also adopt a more expressive, rather rough approach. In both landscapes and portraits, she emphasized the interaction between light and colour. She is remembered above all for the many years she devoted to her art school in Copenhagen where she prepared young artists to enter the Academy.

Awards
In 1947, Høyer was awarded the Eckersberg Medal.

References

External links
Examples of Bizzie Høyer's paintings from Arcadja

1888 births
1971 deaths
20th-century Danish painters
20th-century Danish women artists
20th-century Danish artists
Danish women artists
Artists from Copenhagen
Recipients of the Eckersberg Medal
Royal Danish Academy of Fine Arts alumni